The Danish National Badminton Championships is a tournament organized to crown the best badminton players in Denmark since the season 1930/1931.

Winners

References
 undated

Recurring sporting events established in 1930
1930 establishments in Denmark
National badminton championships